Turşsu may refer to:
 Turşsu, Gadabay, Azerbaijan
 Turşsu, Lachin, Azerbaijan
 Turşsu, Shusha, Azerbaijan